The House at 2123 W. Second Street is a historic building located in the West End of Davenport, Iowa, United States. Before 1871 the property on which this house is located was owned by Ebenezer and Clarissa Cook, a prominent couple whose family estate was in the neighborhood. The 1½-story brick, Saltbox and Greek Revival style residence was a rarity in Davenport. It has been listed on the National Register of Historic Places since 1983.

References

Houses completed in 1855
Greek Revival houses in Iowa
Houses in Davenport, Iowa
Houses on the National Register of Historic Places in Iowa
National Register of Historic Places in Davenport, Iowa